Pangyo may refer to:

 Pangyo County, a county in Kangwon Province, North Korea
 Pangyo-myeon, a township in Seocheon County, South Chungcheong Province, South Korea
 Pangyo, Seongnam, a new town in Seongnam, Gyeonggi Province, South Korea
 Pangyo-dong, a neighborhood in Seongnam
 Pangyo station in Pangyo, Seongnam
 Pangyo Techno Valley, an industrial complex in Pangyo, Seongnam